Bon Rud (also Romanized as Bon Rūd; also known as Bon Rūd-e Khalīfeh) is a village in Khafri Rural District, in the Central District of Sepidan County, Fars Province, Iran. At the 2006 census, its population was 18, in 4 families.

References 

Populated places in Sepidan County